A planetary mnemonic refers to a phrase created to remember the planets and dwarf planet of the Solar System, with the order of words corresponding to increasing sidereal periods of the bodies. One simple visual mnemonic is to hold out both hands side-by-side with thumbs in the same direction (typically left-hand facing palm down, and right-hand palm up). The fingers of hand with palm down represent the terrestrial planets  where the left pinkie represents Mercury and its thumb represents the asteroid belt, including Ceres. The other hand represents the gas giants, with its thumb representing Trans Neptunian objects, including Pluto.

Nine planets
An English-language mnemonic which was current in the 1950s was "Men Very Easily Make Jugs Serve Useful Needs, Perhaps" (for Mercury Venus Earth Mars Jupiter Saturn Uranus Neptune Pluto).  The structure of this sentence suggests that it may have originated before Pluto's discovery, and can easily be trimmed back to reflect Pluto's demotion to dwarf planet.  Another common English-language mnemonic for many years was "My Very Educated (or Eager) Mother Just Served Us Nine Potatoes (or Pizzas)". Other mnemonics include "My Very Elegant Mother Just Sat Upon Nine Porcupines", "My Very Energetic Mother Jumps Skateboards Under Nana's Patio" and "Mary’s violet eyes make Johnnie stay up nights pondering", as well as the apt "My Very Easy Method Just Shows Us Nine Planets", "My Very Efficient Memory Just Stores Up Nine Planets" and "My Very Easy Method Just Speeds Up Naming Planets". 

Many of these mnemonics were made obsolete in 2006, however, with the IAU's 2006 definition of planet which reclassified Pluto (as well as Ceres and Eris) as a dwarf planet.

Eight planets
When Pluto's significance was changed to dwarf planet, mnemonics could no longer include the final "P".  The first notable suggestion came from Kyle Sullivan of Lumberton, Mississippi, USA, whose mnemonic was published in the Jan. 2007 issue of Astronomy magazine: "My Violent Evil Monster Just Scared Us Nuts". In August 2006, for the eight planets recognized under the new definition, Phyllis Lugger, professor of astronomy at Indiana University suggested the following modification to the common mnemonic for the nine planets: "My Very Educated Mother Just Served Us Nachos". She proposed this mnemonic to Owen Gingerich, Chair of the International Astronomical Union (IAU) Planet Definition Committee and published the mnemonic in the American Astronomical Society Committee on the Status of Women in Astronomy Bulletin Board on August 25, 2006. It also appeared in Indiana University's IU News Room Star Trak on August 30, 2006. This mnemonic is used by the IAU on their website for the public. 

Others angry at the IAU's decision to "demote" Pluto composed sarcastic mnemonics in protest. Schott's Miscellany by Ben Schott included the mnemonic, "Many Very Educated Men Justify Stealing Unique Ninth". Mike Brown, who discovered Eris, mentioned hearing "Many Very Educated Men Just Screwed Up Nature". One particular 9 planet mnemonic, "My very easy memory jingle seems useful naming planets", was easily changed once the demotion occurred, becoming the 8 planet mnemonic, "My very easy memory jingle seems useless now".

Eleven planets and dwarf planets
In 2007, the National Geographic Society sponsored a contest for a new mnemonic of MVEMCJSUNPE, incorporating the then-eleven known planets and dwarf planets, including Eris, Ceres, and the newly demoted Pluto.  On February 22, 2008, "My Very Exciting Magic Carpet Just Sailed Under Nine Palace Elephants", coined by 10-year-old Maryn Smith of Great Falls, Montana, was announced as the winner. The phrase was featured in the song 11 Planets by Grammy-nominated singer and songwriter Lisa Loeb and in the book 11 Planets: A New View of the Solar System by David Aguilar.

Thirteen planets and dwarf planets
Since the National Geographic competition, two additional bodies were designated as dwarf planets, Makemake and Haumea, on July 11 and September 17, 2008 respectively.  A 2015 New York Times article suggested some mnemonics including, "My Very Educated Mother Cannot Just Serve Us Nine Pizzas—Hundreds May Eat!"

Longer mnemonics will be required in the future, if more of the possible dwarf planets are recognized as such by the IAU.  However, at some point enthusiasm for new mnemonics will wane as the number of dwarf planets exceeds the number that people will want to learn (it is estimated that there may be up to 200 dwarf planets).

See also
 Lists of astronomical objects

References

Science mnemonics
Mnemonic
Mnemonic
Mnemonic